Pinon is a ghost town in Lincoln County, Kansas, United States.

History
Initially named Battle Creek, it was issued a post office in 1873. The post office was renamed Pinon in 1879, then discontinued in 1888.

References

Former populated places in Lincoln County, Kansas
Former populated places in Kansas